The 2016 AIBA Youth World Boxing Championships was held in Saint Petersburg, Russia, from 17 to 26 November 2016.  The competition was under the supervision of the world's governing body for amateur boxing AIBA and is the junior version of the World Amateur Boxing Championships. The competition was open to boxers born in 1998 and 1999.

Participating nations 
351 boxers from 62 nations competed.

Medal winners

Medal table

References

Youth World Amateur Boxing Championships
Boxing
AIBA
Youth, 2016
Youth World Boxing Championships 2016
AIBA
Sports competitions in Saint Petersburg